Nyx is a fictional character appearing in American comic books published by Marvel Comics. The character is based on the Greek goddess of the same name. She first appeared in Avengers: No Road Home #7 (April 2019) and was created by Al Ewing, Jim Zub, Mark Waid, and Joshua James Shaw.

Publication history
Nyx was created by Al Ewing, Jim Zub, Mark Waid and Joshua James Shaw, based on the primordial goddess of darkness of the same name and first appeared in Avengers: No Road Home #7 and making her last appearance in Avengers: No Road Home #10. She's not to be confused with Nox, based on the same goddess, who was revealed to be a usurper.

Fictional character biography
Nyx was born in the pure emptiness and was one of the Olympians who were once worshiped as gods by the Greeks, as she was worshiped as the Goddess of the Night and the Darkness. At some point, she gave birth to her children Hypnos, Oizys, and the twins Dolos and Apate. Due to her malevolent nature, Zeus imprisoned Nyx in such a manner that she would remain trapped until "the sun was parted from the earth," and hid the Night Shards within her soul in three secret places throughout the Universe.

During Avengers: No Surrender, where the Elder of the Universe, Grandmaster and the Challenger, fought each other, the Earth was removed from its orbit and it was returned at the end of the game, but its removal ended Nyx's containment. In revenge, she sought out to bring an eternal night throughout the Universe, even on planets with multiple suns and bases contained within suns. She took her revenge on the Olympians and with the help of her children, they killed all of the Olympian gods, including Zeus after retrieving information about her hidden Night Shards. However, Zeus threatened and promised to her that his son, Hercules and the "Avengers of the Wronged" would avenge him. 

She was then approached by Hercules, Scarlet Witch, Vision, Hulk, Hawkeye, Rocket Raccoon, Voyager, Monica Rambeau and eventually Conan.Nyx retrieved her Shards of Night from Nightmare, Lord Librarian, and the Hyborian Age, but at the cost of her children's life. After that, with the help of the Cosmic Being, Euphoria, she arrived to her final destination in Long Island, where the One Above All's House of Ideas was. Vision made it through the door entrance of the House of Ideas to stop her from wiping out the existence. During her fight with Vision, he used the powers of the House and with his imagination, constructed many heroes to battle Nyx. She was then killed by Vision by burning her into flames, causing her to be disintegrated.

Powers and abilities
As an Olympian deity, Nyx possesses supernatural attributes, such as immense strength, durability, speed, and reflexes. She has the ability to fly. Being a night goddess, she can wield the darkness and shadows in lots of physical ways, including blinding someone or turning into one herself.  Her own nails could be used as claws. She is able to summon a protective shield. Nyx was shown to have teleporting powers. She is also capable of conceiving children without a partner, seemingly sired by her strongest feelings at the moment.

Reception

Accolades 
 In 2020, CBR.com ranked Nyx 10th in their "10 Marvel Gods With The Highest Kill Count" list.
 In 2021, CBR.com ranked Nyx 1st in their "Marvel: 10 Most Powerful Olympians" list and 7th in their "Marvel: The 10 Strongest Female Gods" list.
 In 2022, Sportskeeda ranked Nyx 10th in their "10 best Greek gods from Marvel comics " list.
 In 2022, Screen Rant included Nyx in their "10 Most Powerful Olympian Gods In Marvel Comics" list.

References

External links

Classical mythology in Marvel Comics
Fictional characters who can manipulate darkness or shadows
Fictional characters who can turn intangible
Fictional characters with immortality
Fictional characters with superhuman durability or invulnerability
Fictional goddesses
Greek and Roman deities in fiction
Marvel Comics characters who can move at superhuman speeds
Marvel Comics characters who can teleport
Marvel Comics characters with superhuman strength
Marvel Comics female supervillains
Nyx